Northcliffe Manor is a neighborhood in Harris County, Texas, United States.

Education
Students living in Northcliffe Manor are zoned to the Klein Independent School District. Residents are zoned to Kaiser Elementary School, Wunderlich Intermediate School, and Klein Forest High School.

References

Unincorporated communities in Harris County, Texas
Unincorporated communities in Texas